Sic bo (骰寶), also known as tai sai (大細), dai siu (大小), big and small or hi-lo, is an unequal game of chance of ancient Chinese origin played with three dice. Grand hazard and chuck-a-luck are variants, both of English origin. The literal meaning of sic bo is "precious dice", while dai siu and dai sai mean "big [or] small".

Sic bo is a casino game, popular in Asia and widely played (as dai siu) in casinos in Macau, Hong Kong. It is played in the Philippines as hi-lo.  It was introduced to the United States by Chinese immigrants in the early 20th century, and can now be found in most American casinos.  Since 2002, it can be played legally in licensed casinos in the United Kingdom.

Gameplay involves betting that a certain condition (e.g. that all three dice will roll the same) will be satisfied by a roll of the dice.

Gameplay
Players place their bets on areas of a table that has been divided into named scoring boxes. The dealer then picks up a small chest containing the dice, which they close and shake, before opening the chest to reveal the combination.

Comparison to craps
Sic bo is one of two casino games involving dice, the other being craps. Sic bo is strictly a game of chance because every roll on the dice results a win or loss on any bet. In craps, some bets require certain rolls before they can become winning or losing bets, thus encouraging strategy.

Betting options

The most common wagers are "Big" and "Small".

Variants
Grand Hazard is a gambling game of English origin, also played with three dice. It is distinct from Hazard, another gambling game of English origin, played with two dice. The dice are either thrown with a cup or rolled down a chute containing a series of inclined planes ("hazard chute") that tumble the dice as they fall. Threes-of-a-kind are known as "raffles" and pay out at 18 to 1.

Chuck-a-luck, also known as "sweat cloth", "chuckerluck" and birdcage, is a variant in the United States, which has its origins in grand hazard. The three dice are kept in a device that resembles a wire-frame bird cage and that pivots about its centre. The dealer rotates the cage end over end, with the dice landing on the bottom. Chuck-a-luck usually features only the single-number wagers, sometimes with an additional wager for any "triple" (all three dice showing the same number) with odds of 30 to 1 (or thereabouts). Chuck-a-luck was once common in Nevada casinos but is now rare, frequently having been replaced by sic bo tables.

See also
 Cee-lo - a gambling game played with three six-sided dice

Notes

References
Regulation in the United Kingdom
 Statutory Instrument 1994 No. 2899 The Gaming Clubs (Bankers' Games) Regulations 1994
 Statutory Instrument 2000 No. 597 The Gaming Clubs (Bankers' Games) (Amendment) Regulations 2000
 Statutory Instrument 2002 No. 1130 The Gaming Clubs (Bankers' Games) (Amendment) Regulations 2002
Regulation in New Zealand
 Division 9 - Tai-Sai of the Rules of Games
 Sicbo Tutorial

Cantonese words and phrases
Chinese games
Dice games
Gambling games